Hootie Mack is the second studio album released by R&B group, Bell Biv DeVoe. It was released through MCA Records on June 1, 1993, and featured production from the group itself and some of R&B's top producers such as Chris Stokes, L.A. Reid and Babyface. As the follow-up to the group's quadruple platinum debut album, Poison, expectations were high. Although Hootie Mack was not as successful as Poison, the album peaked at 19 on the Billboard 200 and 6 on the Top R&B Albums. Two singles made it to the charts—"Something in Your Eyes" and "Above the Rim", the former making it to 38 on the Billboard Hot 100. The album was certified gold on August 25, 1993.

Track listing
"Nickel" (Chris Stokes, Cyrus Melchor, Jacques Kennedy, Louie Carr; Jr., Ricky Bell, Michael Bivins, Ronnie DeVoe) – 3:17
"Above the Rim" (Rico Anderson, Ricky Bell, Michael Bivins, Ronnie DeVoe, Mark Wilson) – 3:37
"Lovely" (Michael Bivins, Carl Bourelly, Louie Carr, Jr., Ronnie DeVoe, Jacques Kennedy, Ricky Bell, Shonda Crable, Mark Wilson) – 3:52
"Ghetto Booty" (Rico Anderson) - 3:52
"Hootie Mack" (Kenyatta Williams, Louie Carr Jr., Jacques Kennedy, Michael Bivins, Ronnie DeVoe, Hamilton Bohannon) – 4:08
"From the Back" (Bret Mazur, Richard Wolf, Ricky Bell, Michael Bivins, Ronnie DeVoe, Shonda Crable, Richard Wolf) – 3:52
"Show Me the Way" (Jay Wright, Anthony Velazquez, Ricky Bell, Michael Bivins, Ronnie DeVoe) – 3:44
"The Situation" (Kenyatta Williams, Ricky Bell, Michael Bivins, Ronnie DeVoe, Taina Monges, Shonda Crable) – 5:34
"Something in Your Eyes" (Kenneth Edmonds) – 4:54
"Please Come Back" (Fatin Dantzler, Lionel Caviness, Charles Robinson, Jr.) – 4:32
"Lost in the Moment" (Fatin Dantzler, Lionel Caviness) – 5:27

Charts

Weekly charts

Year-end charts

Certifications

References

1993 albums
Bell Biv DeVoe albums
MCA Records albums
Albums produced by L.A. Reid
Albums produced by Babyface (musician)